Karin Margareta Kjellsdotter Hansson (1967, Gothenburg) is a Swedish artist and researcher.

Life
Karin Hansson graduated in 1994 from the Royal Institute of Art in Stockholm. 2015 she defender her thesis Accommodating differences Power, belonging, and representation online at the  Department of Computer and Systems Sciences, Stockholm University.

She is an Associate Professor in Computer and Systems Sciences and researcher at The School of Natural Sciences, Technology and Environmental Studies at Södertörn University. In her research practice she combines a critical perspective with applied design research, contributing to research in areas such as net activism, crowdsourcing, digital heritage, participatory research methods, and artistic research.

Career
Hansson is one of the Swedish pioneers in political art and new media. In her work as an artist and art curator she has given the development of the information society a critical artistic comment, with art projects such as Best Before,  Money, Public Opinion, Performing the Common, and Work a Work. Karin Hansson founded the artists' group Association for Temporary Art [a: t] (1996) together with Åsa Andersson Broms, Nils Claesson, Astrid Trotzig, and Josefin Ericsson. She was also active in CRAC (Creative Room for Art and Computing), a media lab for artist that opened in Stockholm 1998.

References

Swedish artists
Swedish women artists
Academic staff of Stockholm University
People from Gothenburg
1967 births
Living people